Big Rock is an unincorporated community in Liberty Township, Jackson County, Ohio, United States.  It is located northwest of Jackson at the intersection of Big Rock Road and Big Run Road.

References 

Unincorporated communities in Jackson County, Ohio